Pay the Girl is the self-titled debut studio album released by American rock band Pay the Girl. It is their only studio album release to date. It was released on March 4, 2003, under TVT Records, which is now defunct.

Five producers lent their producing abilities to the album: Matt Senatore, Rich Liggett, Rick Parashar, Wally Gagel, and Kelly Gray.

The album includes many musicians from popular rock bands, such as Rich Hopkins from American alternative rock band The Sidewinders, Jeremy Hora from Canadian hard rock band Default (he also lent his songwriting talents to the track "So Without"), Bardi Martin from American grunge band Candlebox, Darrell Phillips from American rock band Sister 7, and Brad Smith from American alternative rock band Blind Melon.

The track "Clueless" was featured on the soundtrack of the 2002 teen psychological thriller film Swimfan. It is also credited as their most popular song, whilst "Freeze" and "Beverly" are considered highly as well.

With the release of the album, their sound was often compared to American alternative rock bands Matchbox Twenty and The Verve Pipe.

Track listing

Personnel
Jason Allen Phelps – lead vocals, guitar
Mark Cooper – background vocals, guitar
Dave Harris – guitar
Drew Phillips – bass guitar
Greg Braun – drums

Additional personnel
Matt Chamberlain – percussion
Rich Hopkins – keyboards
Jeremy James Hora – guitar
Bardi Martin – bass
Darrell Phillips – bass
Scott Rockenfield – percussion
C.P. Roth – keyboards
Eric Schermerhorn – guitar
Brad Smith – bass
Jonathan Yudkin – strings

Production
Amy Duarte – production coordination
Wally Gagel – engineer, mixing, producer
Kelly Gray – engineer, mixing, producer
Rick Kerr – mixing
Jerry Lane – engineer, mixing
Mark Liggett – producer
Geoff Ott – engineer
Rick Parashar – engineer, mixing, producer
Tony Schloss – assistant engineer
Matthew "Ammo" Senatore – producer

2003 debut albums